Ni na nebu ni na zemlji is a 1994 Serbian drama film directed by Miloš Radivojević.

Cast 
 Svetozar Cvetković - Nikola
 Bojana Maljević - Ana
 Branislav Lečić - Stole
 Zoran Cvijanović - Pop
 Dragan Nikolić - Igla
 Maja Sabljić - Manuela
 Dragan Zarić - Obrad kelner
 Sonja Savić - Crvenokosa
 Nenad Jezdić - Vlada
 Aleksandar Berček - Ujak Krsta
 Goran Daničić - Kinez
 Bogdan Diklić - Svetislav

References

External links 

1994 drama films
1994 films
Films set in Belgrade
Films shot in Belgrade
Serbian drama films
1990s Serbian-language films